The R374 road is a regional road in County Galway, Ireland.

The official description of the R374 from the Roads Act 1993 (Classification of Regional Roads) Order 2006  reads:

R374: Casla - Lettermullen, County Galway

Between its junction with R343 at Doire an Fhéich and its terminal point at its junction with local road 5234 at Leitir Mealláin Post Office via An Cheathrú Thair, Droichead Bhéal an Daingin, Leitir Móir, Droichead Charraig an Logáin, Tír an Fhia and Kiggaul Bridge all in the county of Galway.

See also
Roads in Ireland
National primary road
National secondary road
Regional road

References

Regional roads in the Republic of Ireland
Roads in County Galway